John Conway (born 8 March 1968, New Zealand) is a retired professional boxer and kickboxer. Conway biggest boxing bout of his career was challenging for the WBO Asia Pacific light heavyweight title against Soulan Pownceby in June 2011. Conway has peaked at 11th on the WBO Asia Pacific Rankings. Conway started his boxing career in the amateur in 1986. If you combine his amateur, professional boxing and kickboxing fight, Conway has had 182 fights.

Currently Conway is the president of the New Zealand Professional Boxing Association and has refereed in over 100 boxing bouts. Conway has refereed and judged in many notable boxers including Chauncy Welliver, Michelle Preston, Daniella Smith, Gunnar Jackson, Robert Berridge, Shane Cameron, Jeff Horn, Izuagbe Ugonoh, Kali Meehan, Brian Minto, and Joseph Parker.

Outside being an official, Conway owns his own gym called Rebel Lee Gar and trains many successful boxers and kickboxers including Adrian Taihia, Baby Nansen, Lani Daniels, Richie Hardcore and David Letele.

NZPBA president
In July 2016, Conway became vice President of NZPBA. In February 2017, Lance Revill resigned as president of NZPBA due to the backlash of the comments made against World Champion Joseph Parker. Due to this, Conway was promoted to Interim President of NZPBA.

Fighting titles and awards

Kickboxing and Muay Thai titles
NZ amateur welterweight kickboxing champion (1991)
NZ thaiboxing professional welterweight champion (1992–2000)
South Pacific welterweight champion (1995)
Hong Kong World welterweight champion (1995)

Awards
Balmoral Lee Gar Thai Boxing Most Determined Professional Fighter (1994–1995)

Professional boxing record

Awards and recognitions
2019 Gladrap Boxing Awards Trainer of the year (Nominated)
2019 Gladrap Boxing Awards Referee of the year (Nominated)
2021 New Zealand Boxing Awards Referee of the year (Won)
2022 New Zealand Boxing Awards Referee of the year (Won)

References

1968 births
Living people
Boxers from Auckland
New Zealand male boxers
Light-heavyweight boxers
Fighters trained by Lolo Heimuli